Central Vista Redevelopment Project refers to the ongoing redevelopment to revamp the Central Vista, India's central administrative area located near Raisina Hill, New Delhi. The area was originally designed by Sir Edwin Lutyens and Sir Herbert Baker during British colonial rule and was retained by Government of India after independence.

The cost of the Central Vista Redevelopment project, which also includes a Common Central Secretariat and the Special Protection Group (SPG) building, has been estimated to be around  spread over four years. Contract of only two projects worth ₹1,339 crores have been awarded till now. These include the New Parliament Building and rejuvenation of Central Vista Avenue at an estimated cost of ₹862 cr and ₹477 cr respectively. The project began with the ceremonial laying of the foundation stone of the New Parliament Building on 10 December 2020.

Background 

The Central Vista was first designed by architect Edwin Lutyens and Herbert Baker, when the capital of the British Raj was moved from Calcutta to
Delhi. The Parliament building alone took six years to construct, from laying the foundation stone on 12 February 1921 to the inauguration by then Viceroy Lord Irwin on 18 January 1927. After Independence in 1947, it became the seat of the government of the new Republic. The Parliament campus was declared a heritage precinct in the 1962 Master plan of Delhi.

The government statement for the new Vista development project stated “As the needs and duties of the government expanded, so did the usage of the space. However, due to the development in the area being around a century old, and the current growth and development of India, the current Central Vista has failed to keep up with the needs of the country”.

The Central Vista Redevelopment Project was launched in 2019. A new Parliament building with increased seating capacity will be built beside the older one as India aims to expand its Parliamentary membership in 2026. The project aims for completion in 2026. This plan did not include the proposed PMO as there were issues of pending land-use change and litigation. The construction of the new Parliament building was temporarily put on hold by Supreme Court of India but was released again within few days with some riders.

Approval and bidding

Approval Process 
The criteria for the competition were set by the Council of Architecture, which included no building being taller than India Gate. The project proponent or client had to seek conceptual approval from the Delhi Urban Arts Commission (DUAC). Financial decisions received clearance from the Central Vigilance Commission. Monetary allocation was provided from the Finance Ministry. Project assessment studies were done by the New Delhi Municipal Corporation (NDMC). The regulatory master plan was done by the Central Public Works Department (CPWD).

Competition 
In reality, instead of a call to competition, there was a Notice Inviting Tender (NIT). The difference is that in a competition the winner is awarded a prize, not a contract; in a tender, there is a firm intent and the winner receives the contract. The bidding was held in two rounds. In the first round, merit was given on possibilities and innovation. In the second round, the winner was decided based on their capacity to deliver results. The winner was decided by a jury, and the names of jury members were announced before the competition.

Finalists 
There were six bidders in the final competition, who presented their proposal to the Central Public Works Department (CPWD), Government of India:

 HCP Design Planning and Management Pvt. Ltd.
 CP Kukreja and Associates Pvt. Ltd.
 HS Contractor Consultancy Pvt. Ltd.
 Sikka Associates Architects
 ARCOP Associates Pvt. Ltd. 
 INI Design Studio Pvt. Ltd.
The design contract was won by Bimal Patel led HCP Design Planning and Management Pvt. Ltd. of Ahmedabad, Gujarat in October 2019. There are different components to the overall project, and the contractors for each component are to be chosen by individual bidding processes.

Plan for Redevelopment 

New Parliament House 

A new triangular building to house the Parliament of India will be built beside the existing structure as the first building under the project. The new Rajya Sabha hall will have a capacity of 384 seats while the new Lok Sabha hall will have 888 seats, with additional capacity up to 1272 seats for hosting joint sessions. It will have digital interface systems, will consume significantly less power and serve for following 150 years while the older structure will be retained as an archeological asset of the country and will be modified for more functional spaces for parliament. The project is expected to be completed in 2026. TATA projects won the bid to construct the building at a cost of ₹861.90 cr in September 2020  and began construction in January 2021.

Kartavya Path 
Shapoorji Pallonji was awarded the tender for the redevelopment of the Central Vista Avenue in January 2021. They were required to complete the project within 300 days and maintain it for five years post-completion. It was inaugurated on 8th September 2022 by the Prime Minister of India, Narendra Modi.

Common Central Secretariat 
A set of ten doughnut-shaped buildings on four plots as Secretariat will be built on either side of Rajpath. The height of all the buildings will be less than 42 meters (height of India Gate) and they will have 7 floors. Exteriors of all buildings will be similar to surrounding Lutyens buildings and they will be connected to each other and to the Delhi Metro network by electric people-movers in underground ways and overground buses.

The existing Secretariat Building houses only 22 ministries with 41,000 employees while the rest are spread across the city of New Delhi. The new facility itself will house all the 51 ministries.

Central Conference Center 
Vigyan Bhavan will be demolished and a new Central Conference Center will be built.

New office and residence for the Vice President and the Prime Minister 
The residence of the Vice President will be relocated to a plot north of the North Block, while the residence and office of the Prime Minister will be moved to a plot south of the South Block. Bringing them both within the Central Vista will cut down on travel time and decrease traffic restrictions.

The Vice President's enclave will be on a site of 15 acres, with 32 five-storey buildings at a maximum height of 15 meters. The Prime Minister's new office and residence will be on a site of 15 acres, with 10 four-storey buildings at a maximum height of 12 meters with a building for keeping Special Protection Group.

Indira Gandhi National Centre for Arts 
The Indira Gandhi National Centre for the Arts (IGNCA) will be relocated from its current home on Man Singh Road, and its role as a cultural space will be expanded. A 15-acre plot near Jamnagar House has been identified to relocate the present building. The new building will retain IGNCA's existing role as a centre for research, publication, events and training while allowing additional facilities to be added.

Reactions

Reception 

Supporters of the project have disputed labelling transformation as an erasure, but rather recognition of the sentiment that India can no longer be defined by colonial symbols. Colonial symbols will neither be destroyed nor appropriated but simply remain. The engaged architect Bimal Patel called the project a triumph of "common sense" with a simple and functional design. He has also stated that the existing listed heritage buildings will be integrated into the project, with any new buildings will be "aesthetically harmonious" with existing buildings.

The project was criticized for being built at a time when India was facing an unprecedented crisis due to Covid-19, as the money allocated for the project could have been used for controlling the pandemic.

Misconception 
There was a misconception for a while when earlier on in the project the estimated cost of the new parliament building (₹862 cr) was mixed up with the old estimate of the entire project (₹20,000 cr). The new estimate of the entire project is around ₹ 13,450 cr.

Lack of regulatory approvals
The project construction did not follow due process. Such a construction process requires approval from the local body, which is New Delhi Municipal Council (NDMC) in this case. The NDMC was totally bypassed as no submissions regarding the project were made to NDMC. So, no papers were signed by any authority assuring that the project adhered to municipal building laws. NDMC was replaced by Central Public Works Department (CPWD), which is not an elected body and therefore has no accountability to public. No provisions exist which allow CPWD to grant approval, but a colonial law (The Government Building Act, 1899) was activated to empower CPWD. Basically, this law gives central government power to build anywhere without approval of the urban local body. Other bodies like Delhi Urban Art Commission (DUAC) were notified to treat CPWD as local body, without any such provision. No technical drawings for any part of the project were sent to any authority for approval. No independent environmental impact assessment was done, and so the project did not get clearance for environment, as mandated by Environment Ministry’s 2006 notification on Environmental Impact Assessment (EIA).

Status updates
 Sep 2019: The master plan of Redevelopment of Central Vista Avenue is conceived by the Government of India. 
 Oct 2019: Ahmedabad based HCP Design Planning and Management Pvt Ltd, won the architectural consultancy work.
 Sep 2020: Tata Projects Ltd won the construction work of New Parliament Building for ₹862 cr by the CPWD. 
 Dec 2020: Foundation stone of New Parliament Building laid by Prime Minister Narendra Modi on 10 December 2020.
 Jan 2021: Supreme Court of India approves the Central Vista Project on 5 January. Shapoorji Pallonji and Company Pvt Ltd won the construction work of Rajpath Redevelopment for ₹477 cr from CPWD.
 May 2021: The High Court of Delhi dismissed the plea on 31 May, that sought direction to suspend the construction activities. The court order also said that Central Vista Avenue is a vital and essential national project.
 Jun 2021: The Ministry of Housing and Urban Affairs issues a clarification about the project value of Central Vista Avenue. Only two construction projects worth ₹1,339 cr have been awarded up to now.
16 Sep 2021: Inauguration of the new Defense Offices Complex.
26 Sep 2021: Prime Minister Narendra Modi spent almost an hour at the site of the proposed Central Vista project and carried out a first-hand inspection of the construction status of the new Parliament building. There was no prior intimation or security detail regarding his visit.
23 Jun 2022: Vanijya Bhawan is inaugurated by PM, it is the new headquarters of Ministry of Commerce and Industry.
11 Jul 2022: Prime Minister Narendra Modi unveiled a bronze cast of India's National Emblem on top of the new parliament building.
 8 September 2022: Prime Minister inaugurated the revamped Central Vista Avenue and renamed it Kartavya Path, from Rajpath. This was done as a part of recent Anti-Colonial drive in the country. The Prime Minister also unveiled the statue of Netaji Subhash Chandra Bose installed at the India Gate hexagon, under the Grand Canopy.

See also 
 Architecture of India
 Bimal Patel
 Raisina Hill
 Lutyens' Delhi

References 

New Delhi
Infrastructure in India
Redevelopment